Monitor National Marine Sanctuary is the site of the wreck of the , one of the most famous shipwrecks in U.S. history. It was designated as the country's first national marine sanctuary on January 30, 1975, and is one of only two of the sixteen national marine sanctuaries created to protect a cultural resource rather than a natural resource. Since its sinking in 1862, the Monitor has become an artificial reef attracting numerous fish species, including amberjack, black sea-bass, oyster toadfish and great barracuda.

USS Monitor

The Monitor was the prototype for a class of U.S. Civil War ironclad, turreted warships that significantly altered both naval technology and marine architecture in the nineteenth century. Designed by the Swedish engineer John Ericsson, the vessel contained all of the emerging innovations that revolutionized warfare at sea. The Monitor was constructed in a mere 110 days.

While the design of Monitor was well-suited for river combat, her low freeboard and heavy turret made her highly unseaworthy in rough waters. This feature probably led to the early loss of the original Monitor, which foundered during a heavy storm. Swamped by high waves while under tow by Rhode Island, she sank on December 30, 1862 in the Atlantic Ocean off Cape Hatteras. Sixteen of 62 crewmen were lost in the storm.

Rediscovery

In 1973, the wreck of the ironclad Monitor was located on the floor of the Atlantic Ocean by an interdisciplinary team of scientists from Duke University’s Marine Laboratory. The discovery was preceded by extensive historical research and the selection of probable areas for the Monitor’s sinking. The search team located what they believed to be the wreck of the Monitor using side-scan sonar and remotely operated cameras. In 1974, the U.S. Navy and the National Geographic Society launched a second expedition that confirmed the identity of the Monitor and produced detailed photographic documentation of the wreck site. One year later, in 1975, the site was designated as the nation’s first marine sanctuary.

Preservation

Initial dives in the 1970s and later research expeditions in the early 1990s have indicated that the Monitor’s iron hull, having been inundated with saltwater for over 100 years, is deteriorating at an accelerated rate. In 1998, the U.S. National Oceanic and Atmospheric Administration (NOAA) developed a plan to recover significant "iconic" sections of the wreck for conservation and public display. Additionally, NOAA developed a plan to help stabilize the wreck from further deterioration as much as possible.

The warship's propeller was raised to the surface in 1998. On July 16, 2001, divers from the Monitor National Marine Sanctuary and the US Navy brought to the surface the  steam engine. Due to the depth of the wreck, the divers utilized surface supplied diving techniques while breathing heliox. In 2002, after 41 days of work, the revolutionary revolving gun turret was recovered by the NOAA and a team of U.S. Navy divers. Before removing the turret, divers discovered the remains of two trapped crew members. The remains of these sailors, who died while on duty, are at the Joint POW-MIA Accounting Command at Hickam Air Force Base, Hawaii, awaiting positive identification.

Many artifacts from Monitor, including her turret, propeller, anchor, engine, delicate glass bottles, lumps of coal, wood paneling, a leather book cover and even walnut halves, have been conserved and are on display at the Mariners' Museum of Newport News, Virginia. Once conservation is complete, artifacts are available for exhibition and study.  While the majority of the Monitor artifacts remain at The Mariners’ Museum, other facilities including the Richmond National Battlefield Park in Virginia, Civil War Naval Museum in Columbus, Georgia, Nauticus in Norfolk, Virginia, and soon the Graveyard of the Atlantic Museum in Hatteras, North Carolina, also display artifacts from the historic ship.

In 1986, Monitor was designated a National Historic Landmark.

References

External links

 

National Marine Sanctuaries of the United States
Protected areas of Dare County, North Carolina
Protected areas of North Carolina
1975 establishments in North Carolina